Cotana splendida is a moth in the family Eupterotidae. It was described by Rothschild in 1932. It is found in New Guinea.

References

Moths described in 1932
Eupterotinae